Nyangweso is a settlement in Kenya's Nyanza Province.

Populated places in Nyanza Province